Mahalleh-ye Baghel (also Romanized as Maḩalleh-e Baghel) is a village in Sakhvid Rural District, Nir District, Taft County, Yazd Province, Iran. At the 2006 census, its population was 64, in 21 families.

References 

Populated places in Taft County